Keels Creek is a stream in Carroll County in the U.S. state of Arkansas. It is a tributary to the Kings River.

Keels Creek has the name of Keel Williams, an early settler.

References

Rivers of Carroll County, Arkansas
Rivers of Arkansas